The 1952 Australian Championships was a tennis tournament that took place on outdoor Grass courts at the Memorial Drive, Adelaide, Australia from 19 January to 28 January. It was the 40th edition of the Australian Championships (now known as the Australian Open), the 10th held in Adelaide, and the first Grand Slam tournament of the year. The singles titles were won by Australians Ken McGregor and Thelma Coyne Long.

Finals

Men's singles

 Ken McGregor defeated   Frank Sedgman  7–5, 12–10, 2–6, 6–2

Women's singles

 Thelma Coyne Long defeated   Helen Angwin  6–2, 6–3

Men's doubles
 Ken McGregor /  Frank Sedgman defeated  Don Candy /  Mervyn Rose 6–4, 7–5, 6–3

Women's doubles
 Thelma Coyne Long /  Nancye Wynne Bolton  defeated  Alison Burton Baker /  Mary Bevis Hawton 6–1, 6–1

Mixed doubles
 Thelma Coyne Long /  George Worthington defeated  Gwen Thiele /  Tom Warhurst 9–7, 7–5

References

External links
 Australian Open official website

Australian Championships
Australian Championships (tennis) by year
Australian Championships
Australian Championships